The Taer 2 (meaning "bird") is an Iranian mid-range radar guided solid fueled surface-to-air missile designed to defend against aerial threats at altitudes of up to 25–27 km (75000 ft) and distances of up to 50 km away. It is meant for use as part of the Ra'ad air defense system, and was revealed during a military parade in Tehran on 21 September 2012. It shows similarities to the 9M317 missile just as the Raad air defense system does to the Buk missile system.

History
During Velayat 91 maneuvers in December 2012 the Iranian Navy successfully tested the Raad Air Defense System but it is not clear if the Raad missile tested in Iranian Navy is the same one as the Taer-2 missile of Raad system designed by the IRGC Aerospace Force.

References 

Surface-to-air missiles of Iran
21st-century surface-to-air missiles
Guided missiles of Iran
Military equipment introduced in the 2010s